Resurgam (Latin: "I shall rise again") is an early Victorian submarine and its prototype, designed and built in Britain by Reverend George Garrett. She was intended as a weapon to penetrate the chain netting placed around ship hulls to defend against attack by torpedo vessels.

Resurgam I
The first Resurgam, built in 1878, was a 14 ft (5 m), hand-powered, one-man vessel nicknamed "the curate's egg" because of her shape. She was a one-third size prototype for Garrett's design.

Resurgam II

Construction

The second Resurgam was built by Cochran & Co. at Birkenhead and launched on 26 November 1879. Her construction was of iron plates fastened to iron frames, with the central section of the vessel clad with wood secured by iron straps. She was powered by a closed-cycle steam engine originally patented in 1872 by the American engineer Emile Lamm, which provided enough steam to turn the single propeller for up to four hours. She was designed to have positive buoyancy, and diving was controlled by a pair of hydroplanes amidships. At the time she cost £1,538.

After successful trials in the East Float at Wallasey, it was planned that Resurgam should make her way under her own power from Birkenhead to Portsmouth for a demonstration to the Royal Navy.

Loss
On 10 December 1879  Resurgam, crewed by Garret, Jackson (as skipper) and Price (engineer) set out for Portsmouth. However, during the voyage mechanical problems caused the crew to dock at Foryd Harbour, Rhyl, for repairs. Once completed, and after trials, the crew set sail on the night of 24 February 1880 in a high wind, towed by the steam yacht Elphin, which Garrett had bought to act as a tender. The Elphin developed engine problems and the Resurgam's crew transferred to her to assist.  Because the entry hatch on the Resurgam could not be fastened from outside, the submarine began to ship water and the tow-rope broke under the added weight, the Resurgam sinking in Liverpool Bay off Rhyl on 25 February 1880.

Discovery of wreck
For many years the exact location of Resurgam was a mystery. On 4 July 1996 Resurgam was designated protected wreck No. 42 under the Protection of Wrecks Act.

The Resurgam'''s hull is intact although partially damaged and remains at risk from illegal diving and trawling.  Since her discovery, the conning tower steering wheel has been broken and portable items have gone missing.

In 1997, a project called SUBMAP was undertaken by the Archaeological Diving Unit to study the wreck site. Over one hundred volunteer divers, coordinated by the Nautical Archaeology Society, surveyed the structure of the hull and the colonising marine life around it, using remote sensing equipment to search for debris in the surrounding area. The results of the SUBMAP project have been published as a comprehensive digital archive using Site Recorder.  The wreck is currently protected against further corrosion by sacrificial anodes that had been attached to the hull. Plans to raise her have so far not been fruitful.Resurgam was featured in the TV programme Wreck Detectives in 2004. In 2007 divers from the British Sub-Aqua Club in Trafford undertook conservation work, placing zinc sacrificial anodes on the wreck. In 2012 divers from the British Sub-Aqua Club in Chester also replaced sacrificial anodes on the wreck.

Replica
A replica of the vessel was built by trainees at the AMARC Training College attached to the Cammell Laird shipyard, Birkenhead, in 1996–97. She was put on display at Woodside Ferry Terminal, Birkenhead, in March 1997.

After falling into disrepair the replica was refurbished by students of the North West Maritime and Engineering College in 2009.

See also
 Plongeur Ictineo II Notes 

References
 The Father of the Submarine, Scanlan Murphy W., 1987, William Kimber & Co Ltd, 
 Divernet article about discovering the submarine Retrieved 20 November 2006
 Fenwick, Valerie and Gale, Alison (1998), pp 143–144, Historic Shipwrecks, Discovered, Protected and Investigated, Tempus Publishing Limited, .
 Statutory Instrument 1996 No. 1741 Office of Public Sector Information. Retrieved 19 October 2006
 Advisory Committee on Historic Wreck Annual Report 2005. Retrieved 6 October 2006
 Wreck Detectives 2004
 Mersey Shipping News (16 March 1997) Retrieved 12 October 2007
 SUBMAP Photographs Retrieved 4 September 2009
 Compton-Hall R. (1999), pp 81–94, The Submarine Pioneers, Sutton Publishing Ltd, 
 
 Scanlan Murphy W. (1987), pp 62–83, The Father of the Submarine, William Kimber & Co Ltd, 
 Bowers P. (1999), pp89–129, The Garrett Enigma, Airlife Publishing Ltd., 
 Ivor Wynne Jones, Shipwrecks of North Wales'' 5th Ed (2007) 
 BBC article about Resurgam

External links

English inventions
Shipwrecks in the Irish Sea
Ships built on the River Mersey
Protected Wrecks of Wales
19th-century submarines
Maritime incidents in February 1880
1880 in Wales
Abandoned military projects of the United Kingdom
Archaeology of shipwrecks